Miyauchi (written: 宮内) is a Japanese surname. Notable people with the surname include:

, Japanese actor and voice actor
, Japanese actor
, Japanese writer and activist
, Japanese actor and voice actor
, Japanese bobsledder
, Japanese tennis player
, Japanese singer
, Japanese footballer
, Japanese singer
, Japanese businessman
Haruka Miyauchi (宮内 はるか, born 1993), Japanese singer in GWSN

Fictional characters
, a character in the manga series Non Non Biyori
, protagonist of the manga series Inubaka

Japanese-language surnames